Mercedes Odina (born 11 October 1959, in Barcelona, Spain) is a Spanish journalist, author, film director and culture manager.

Career in journalism
Mercedes Odina has a Bachelor of Arts degree in Communication from the Universidad Autonoma de Barcelona. She began her career at Radio Miramar and in 1985 she joined the Information Services of the Spanish Television RTVE. Shortly after, she became part of the team of editors of Informe semanal. In 1989 she began her first film project as an author, director and screenwriter of the documentary series of 10 one-hour chapters Los años vividos (The Years We Lived)- a complete review of the 20th century in Spain based on the memory of 250 most outstanding Spanish personalities. The program was awarded with the Premios Ondas Internacional de Television in 1992.

In 1991, she was appointed director of investigative journalism program Dossier 21 in RTVE, Spanish Television. This series consisted of 10 research documentaries with topics related to current events and the recent past. Some of the documentaries produced during this period, such as Objective: Kill Franco were broadcast by various foreign television channels and were exhibited in international festivals. In 1995 she moved to New York as a correspondent of the Spanish Television RTVE.

In 1997, she published her first book, America Sociedad Anonima, and until 2005 she combined work as a professor of Communication at the University Ramon Llull of Barcelona with writing and collaboration with several radio, television channels and newspapers. In April 2005, she was nominated as the Head of the Department of Communication, Marketing and Promotion of Expo 2008. From 2008-2009 she was the Head of  Culture  at Canning House, the Hispanic and Luso Brazilian Council in London.

Books
March 1997. AMERICA SOCIEDAD ANÓNIMA, Planeta: Documented exposition of the different aspects (socially, economically and politically) that make up the picture of the United States at present. 
March 1998. EL FACTOR FAMA, Anagrama: Analysis of the transformation of the concept and value of Fame after the emergence of audiovisual mass media. 
March 2000. LA ALDEA IRREAL, El País Aguilar: The book presents an analysis of the development and impact of the new scientific and technological revolution currently developing in the world.. 
March 2005. EUROPA VERSUS USA, Espasa Calpe: The book offers a reflection on the concept of the Western Civilization, and an analysis of the different concepts that unites and separates the United States and the European Union.

Filmography
October 1992. Los años vividos (The years we lived), director and script writer, RTVE Madrid, Spain. Premios Ondas International Television Award.
September 2004. New York, New York: the great city of the world, director and script writer, PBS USA / Sagrera TV productions.

Awards
 October 1992. Ondas International Television Award for the series ''Los años vividos (The years we lived)’’
 March 1998. Finalist XXVI Edition of the Anagrama Award of Essay for the book El Factor Fama (The Fame Factor)

References

External links

 Library of Congress
  Los años vividos, RTVE broadcast
 Los años vividos, Trailer

Living people
Spanish women writers
People from Barcelona
Spanish documentary filmmakers
Spanish journalists
1959 births
Women documentary filmmakers